Tverskaya Zastava is a square in Central Administrative Okrug in Moscow. Belorussky railway station faces the square. The streets which terminate at the square are, in counterclockwise order, Leningradsky Avenue, Gruzinsky Val, 2nd Brestskaya Street, 1st Brestskaya Street, 1st Tverskaya-Yamskaya Street, Lesnaya Street, and Butyrsky Val.

History 
The site of the square is the former edge of the city of Moscow on the road to Tver. A customs post (zastava) was established there in 1742. Victorious Russian armies passed through the gate there, and in 1814 a wooden triumphal arch was erected at what was now called Triumphalnaya (Triumphal) Square, to celebrate victory over Napoleon. In 1834 this was replaced by a masonry arch and the square was renamed New Triumphal Gates Square. 

What is now Belorussky railway station opened at the square in 1870 under the name of Smolensky station. It was renamed to Brest station after the line was extended, and again to Aleksandrovsky station after the building was redesigned. In May 1936 it was given its present name of Belorussky station. That year the square was redesigned and the arch removed; it is now at Victory Square.

By 1950 Tverskaya Zastava Square had been laid out as a park. A bronze statue of Maxim Gorky was installed there in 1951, but when the square was reconstructed in 2008, was removed to the sculpture park near the Central House of Artists.

Gallery

References 

Streets in Moscow